"Money for Nothing" is a song by British rock band Dire Straits, the second track on their fifth studio album, Brothers in Arms (1985). It was released as the album's second single on 28 June 1985 through Vertigo Records. The song's lyrics are written from the point of view of two working-class men watching music videos and commenting on what they see. The song features a guest appearance by Sting singing background vocals, providing both the signature falsetto introduction and backing chorus of "I want my MTV." The groundbreaking video was the first to be aired on MTV Europe when the network launched on 1 August 1987.

It was Dire Straits' most commercially successful single, peaking at number 1 for three weeks on both the US Billboard Hot 100 and Top Rock Tracks chart and number 4 in the band's native UK. In July 1985, the month following its release, Dire Straits and Sting performed the song at Live Aid. At the 28th Annual Grammy Awards in 1986, "Money for Nothing" won Best Rock Performance by a Duo or Group with Vocal and was nominated for Record of the Year and Song of the Year as well. At the 1986 MTV Video Music Awards, the music video received 11 nominations, winning Video of the Year and Best Group Video.

Composition

Music
"Money for Nothing" is a pop rock song. Knopfler modeled his guitar sound on ZZ Top guitarist Billy Gibbons' trademark guitar tone, as ZZ Top's music videos were already a staple of early MTV. Gibbons told Timothy White of Musician in late 1985 that Knopfler had solicited Gibbons' help in replicating the tone, adding, "He didn't do a half-bad job, either, considering that I never told him a goddamned thing!"

Following the initial sessions in Montserrat, at which that particular guitar part was recorded, Neil Dorfsman attempted to recreate the sound during subsequent sessions at the Power Station in New York but was unsuccessful.

The recording contains a highly recognisable hook, in the form of the guitar riff that begins the song proper. The guitar riff continues throughout the song, played in permutation during the verses, and played in full after each chorus. The song's extended overture was shortened for radio and music video.

Lyrics
Mark Knopfler described the writing of the song in a 1984 interview with critic Bill Flanagan:

In 2000, Knopfler appeared on Parkinson on BBC One and explained again where the lyrics originated. According to Knopfler, he was in New York City and had visited an appliance store. At the back of the store was a wall of televisions which were all tuned to MTV. Knopfler then said there was a male employee dressed in a baseball cap, work boots, and a checkered shirt delivering boxes who was standing next to him watching. As they were standing there watching MTV, Knopfler remembers the man coming up with lines such as "what are those, Hawaiian noises?...that ain't workin'," etc. Knopfler then requested a pen to write some of these lines down and then eventually put those words to music.
The first-person narrating character in the lyrics refers to a musician "banging on the bongos like a chimpanzee" and a woman "stickin' in the camera, man we could have some fun". He describes a singer as "that little faggot with the earring and the make-up", and bemoans that these artists get "money for nothing and chicks for free".

The songwriting credits are shared between Mark Knopfler and Sting. According to Knopfler, he used the "I want my MTV" line after seeing an MTV advertisement featuring the Police and setting it to the tune of "Don't Stand So Close To Me" (written by Sting), hence the cowriting credit. "Sting used to come to Montserrat to go windsurfing," recalled John Illsley, "and he came up for supper at the studio. We played him 'Money for Nothing' and he turned round and said, 'You've done it this time, you bastards.' Mark said if he thought it was so good, why didn't he go and add something to it. He did his bit there and then."

Sting elaborated on his co-writing credit in a 1987 interview:

However, keyboard player Alan Clark claims the "I want my MTV" intro was his idea and not Knopfler's. According to him, the song originally began with the guitar riff, and then he developed the intro on keyboards and sang "I want my MTV" on top during a break in rehearsals for the album.

Music video

The music video for the song features early 3D computer animation illustrating the lyrics. The video was one of the first uses of computer-animated human characters and was groundbreaking at the time of its release.

Two other music videos are also featured within "Money for Nothing". The Hungarian pop band Első Emelet and their video "Állj, Vagy Lövök!" ("Stop or I'll Shoot!") appears as "Baby, Baby" by "First Floor" during the second verse (The name "első emelet" translates to "first floor", and the song is credited as being on "Magyar Records": "Magyar" means "Hungarian" in the Hungarian language.) The other one is fictional, "Sally" by the "Ian Pearson Band". The fictional album for the first video was listed as "Turn Left" and the second was "Hot Dogs". For the second video, the record company appears as "Rush Records", and it was filmed on Fisherman's Bastion, Budapest, Hungary.

Originally, Mark Knopfler was not at all enthusiastic about the concept of the music video. MTV, however, was insistent on it. Director Steve Barron, of Rushes Postproduction in London, was contacted by Warner Bros. to persuade Knopfler to relent. Describing the contrasting attitudes of Knopfler and MTV, he said:

Barron then flew to Budapest to convince Knopfler of their concept. Meeting together after a gig, Knopfler was still unimpressed, but this time his girlfriend was present and took a hand. According to Barron:

Ian Pearson and Gavin Blair created the animation, using a Bosch FGS-4000 CGI system and a Quantel Paintbox system. The animators went on to found computer animation studio Mainframe Entertainment (today Mainframe Studios), and referenced the "Money for Nothing" video in an episode of their ReBoot series. The video also includes stage footage of Dire Straits performing, with partially rotoscoped animation in bright neon colours, as seen on the cover of the compilation album of the same name.

Notable performances
When Dire Straits performed "Money for Nothing" at the 1985 Live Aid Concert at Wembley Stadium, the performance featured a guest appearance by Sting. Knopfler performed "Money for Nothing" using his Gibson Les Paul guitar with a pair of Soldano SLO-100 tube/valve amplifier heads and Marshall speaker cabinets during the Nelson Mandela 70th Birthday Tribute and the Prince's Trust concerts in 1986 with Sting, as well as the Nordoff-Robbins charity show at Knebworth in 1990 and the On Every Street world tours in 1991/1992. These versions featured extended guitar solos by Knopfler, backed by Eric Clapton and Phil Palmer.

Reception
Cash Box said that it's "a simply rocking cut taking a look at jobs and videos performed by rock stars."  Billboard called it a "bluesy poke at [Dire Straits' and Sting's] own kind; intentions ambiguous."

Rolling Stone listed the song as the 94th greatest guitar song of all time, noting how Mark Knopfler "traded his pristine, rootsy tone for a dry, over-processed sound achieved by running a Les Paul through a wah-wah pedal on a track that became one of the [MTV] network's earliest hits." The video was awarded "Video of the Year" (among many other nominations) at the third annual MTV Video Music Awards in 1986.

Accolades

Lyrics debate
The lyrics for the song have been criticised as being homophobic by critics. In a late 1985 interview in Rolling Stone magazine, Knopfler expressed mixed feelings on the controversy:

Dire Straits often performed the song in live concerts and when on tour, where the second verse was included but often altered slightly. For the band's 10 July 1985 concert (televised in the United Kingdom on The Tube on Channel 4 in January 1986), Knopfler replaced the word faggot with queenie:

In January 2011, the Canadian Broadcast Standards Council (CBSC) ruled that the unedited version of the song was unacceptable for air play on private Canadian radio stations, as it breached the Canadian Association of Broadcasters' code of ethics and their equitable portrayal code. The CBSC concluded that "like other racially driven words in the English language, 'faggot' is one that, even if entirely or marginally acceptable in earlier days, is no longer so." The CBSC's proceedings came in response to a radio listener's Ruling Request stemming from a playing of the song by CHOZ-FM in St. John's, Newfoundland and Labrador, which in turn followed the radio listener's dissatisfaction with the radio station's reply to their complaint about the word 'faggot' in the lyrics.

Not all stations abided by this ruling; at least two stations, CIRK-FM in Edmonton, Alberta and CFRQ-FM in Halifax, Nova Scotia, played the unedited version of "Money for Nothing" repeatedly for one hour out of protest. Galaxie, which was owned by the Canadian Broadcasting Corporation (the CBC) at the time of the controversy, also continues to play the song. On 21 January 2011, the Canadian Radio-television and Telecommunications Commission asked the CBSC for a review on the ban, in response to the public outcry against the CBSC's actions; the commission reportedly received over 250 complaints erroneously sent to them, instead of the CBSC. The regulator requested the CBSC to appoint a nationwide panel to review the case, as the decision on the ban was reviewed by a regional panel for the Maritimes and Newfoundland.

On 31 August 2011, the CBSC reiterated that it found the use of 'faggot' to be inappropriate; however, because of considerations in regard to its use in context, the CBSC has left it up to the stations to decide whether to play the original or edited versions of the song. Most of the CBSC panelists thought it was inappropriate, but it was used only in a satirical, non-hateful manner.

Charts

Weekly charts

Year-end charts

Certifications and sales

See also
"Weird Al" Yankovic's parody "Money for Nothing/Beverly Hillbillies*"
List of Billboard Hot 100 number-one singles of 1985
List of Billboard Mainstream Rock number-one songs of the 1980s
List of Cash Box Top 100 number-one singles of 1985
List of number-one singles of 1985 (Canada)

References

External links
Mix Online Classic Tracks: Dire Straits' "Money for Nothing"

1985 singles
1985 songs
British pop rock songs
Billboard Hot 100 number-one singles
Cashbox number-one singles
Dire Straits songs
Money for Nothing
Music videos directed by Steve Barron
RPM Top Singles number-one singles
Song recordings produced by Mark Knopfler
LGBT-related controversies in music
Songs about rock music
Songs about television
Obscenity controversies in music
Animated music videos
Songs written by Mark Knopfler
Songs written by Sting (musician)
Vertigo Records singles
Warner Records singles
Songs about consumerism
Satirical songs